En or EN may refer to:

Businesses
 Bouygues (stock symbol EN)
 Island Rail Corridor, formerly known as the Esquimalt and Nanaimo Railway (reporting mark EN)
 Euronews, a news television and internet channel

Language and writing
 En or N, the 14th letter of the Roman alphabet
 EN (cuneiform), the mark in Sumerian cuneiform script for a High Priest or Priestess meaning "lord" or "priest"
 En (Cyrillic) (Н, н), a letter of the Cyrillic alphabet, equivalent to the Roman letter "n"
 En (digraph), ‹en› used as a phoneme
 En (typography), a unit of width in typography
 en dash, a dash one en long
 En language, a language spoken in northern Vietnam
 English language (ISO 639-1 language code en)

Organisations
 Eastern National, a US organization providing educational products to National Park visitors
 English Nature, a former UK government conservation agency
 Envirolink Northwest, an environmental organization in England

Religion
 En (deity) in Albanian mythology

Science and technology
 Engineer
 En (Lie algebra), a family of En Lie algebras, unique for 70n=5..8
 EN standards, European technical standards
 Electroless nickel plating, a chemical technique
 Electronegativity, chemical tendency to attract electrons
 Engrailed (gene), a gene involved in early embryological development
 Erythema nodosum, an inflammation of the fat cells under the skin
 Ethylenediamine, C2H8N2, an organic compound 
 Exanewton (EN), an SI unit of force: 1018 newtons
 Endangered species, a conservation status level

Other uses
 EuroNight, the European night train designation
 Yen, Japanese currency unit, pronounced en
 Empty net goal in ice hockey
 Enrolled Nurse, an Australian term for a licensed practical nurse
 English Wikipedia
 Air Dolomiti, IATA Code of Italian regional airline
 En Esch (born 1968), stage name for German musician Nicklaus Schandelmaier
 "EN", a song by Arca